The men's individual recurve competition at the 2007 World Archery Championships took place in July 2007 in Leipzig, Germany. 173 archers entered the competition. Following a qualifying FITA round, the top 128 archers qualified for the 7-round knockout round, drawn according to their qualification round scores. The semi-finals and finals then took place on 15 July.

The competition doubled as qualification for the 2008 Olympic competition.

Qualifying
The following archers were the leading 16 qualifiers:

Draw

Top Half

Section 1

Section 2

Section 3

Section 4

Bottom Half

Section 5

Section 6

Section 7

Section 8

Finals

References

2007 World Archery Championships